Chini (also Romanized as Chīnī; also known as Chaman Galleh) is a village in Sadat Rural District, in the Central District of Lali County, Khuzestan Province, Iran. At the 2006 census, its population was 161, in 36 families.

References 

Populated places in Lali County